Chris Chapman is a former professional rugby league footballer who played in the 1990s and 2000s.

Genealogical information
Chris Chapman is the father of the rugby league footballer; Reece Chapman-Smith.

References

1970s births
Living people
Dewsbury Rams players
English rugby league players
Leeds Rhinos players
Sheffield Eagles players
Rugby league centres
Rugby league players from Yorkshire
Rugby league wingers